Melody Joy Iliffe (née Welsh, 10 April 1938 - 21 September 2017) was an Australian Logie Award-winning news presenter.

Career
Iliffe is best remembered for becoming the first woman to co-anchor a prime time news bulletin on Australian television after she was chosen to read the 6pm news alongside Don Seccombe on QTQ-9 in Brisbane in 1964.  Welsh had previously been a production assistant on the station's children's program The Channel Niners hosted by "Captain" Jim Iliffe.

She married Jim Iliffe in 1964. They had three children, including David who is now a media veteran himself and a long serving breakfast presenter on ABC Southern Queensland in Toowoomba.

Although she kept a low profile after her marriage, Melody Iliffe regularly appeared in television commercials for Brisbane-based electrical good retailer Chandlers throughout the 1980's. She also co-hosted QTQ-9's 25th anniversary of Queensland television broadcast in 1984 and appeared at the station's 50th anniversary celebration in 2009.

Jim Iliffe died in 2005. Melody Illife died on 21 September 2017. A funeral service was held for her at St Andrew's Anglican Church in Indooroopilly on 29 September 2017.  At the time of her death, she had eight grandchildren.

Logie Award
The achievement of being the first female newsreader in Australia was recognised at the Logie Awards of 1965 when Welsh was presented with a special Logie Award for "acknowledged ability, in a man's domain."

References 

1938 births
2017 deaths
Australian women television presenters
Australian television newsreaders and news presenters
Nine News presenters